Margareta Petrovna Froman (8 November 1890 – 24 March 1970), known professionally as Margarita Froman, was a Russian ballet dancer, dance educator, and choreographer. (Sources vary on her birthdate; some give a year as late as 1896.)

Early life 
Margareta Petrovna Froman was born in Moscow, the daughter of a Swedish father and a Russian mother. She began her dance studies at the Imperial School of Ballet.

Career 
Froman was a soloist at the Bolshoi Theatre in Moscow as a young woman. She toured Europe and the United States with Diaghilev's Ballets Russes. She appeared in an early Russian silent film, dancing in Aziade (1918) with Mikhail Mordkin.

In 1917 she moved to Yugoslavia with her brothers Maximilian, Pavel, and Valentin, who all also worked in the dance profession. She was ballet mistress at the Croatian National Theatre, and choreographer at the Zagreb Opera Ballet, and the State Opera Ballet in Belgrade. In 1938 she choreographed and produced several shows in Milan, at La Scala. She retired from performing in 1947. She created choreography for the film Zastava (1949). In 1955 she choreographed the Yugoslav National Opera and Ballet's London productions of Prince Igor, Romeo and Juliet, The Devil in the Village, Ero the Joker and The Gingerbread Heart.

Froman moved to the United States in 1957, and taught with her brother Maximilian at the Froman Professional School of Ballet in New London, Connecticut. She also taught at the Hartford Conservatory and the University of Connecticut.

One of her noted students was Mia Slavenska.

Personal life 
Margarita Froman lived in Willimantic, Connecticut for her last 13 years. She died in 1970, aged 80 years, in Boston. Her papers were donated to the University of Connecticut by her sister, Olga. Her grave is in the Russian Orthodox Cemetery in Willimantic.

References 

1890 births
1970 deaths
Choreographers from the Russian Empire
Ballerinas from the Russian Empire
Women choreographers
People from the Russian Empire of Swedish descent
Yugoslav emigrants to the United States
White Russian emigrants to Yugoslavia
20th-century Russian women